Song Xintao (born 11 October 2001) is a Chinese footballer currently playing as a left-footed midfielder for Hebei.

Club career
Song Xintao was promoted to the senior team of Hebei within the 2021 Chinese Super League season and would make his debut in a league game on 22 July 2021 against Shanghai Port F.C. in a 1-0 defeat.

Career statistics
.

References

External links

2001 births
Living people
Chinese footballers
Association football midfielders
Chinese Super League players
Hebei F.C. players